Mamia IV Gurieli (died 1778 or 1784), of the western Georgian House of Gurieli, was Prince of Guria from 1726 to 1756 and again from 1758 to 1765 and from 1771 to 1776. Intermissions of his rule was the result of Mamia's rivalry with his younger brother, Giorgi V Gurieli, and complex political situation in the region, including the Ottoman encroachments and efforts by the kings of Imereti to bring western Georgian polities under their supreme authority.

Early rule 
Mamia was the eldest son of Giorgi IV Gurieli, Prince of Guria, by his wife, Elene née Shervashidze-Eristavi. He was born before 1717, the year when Giorgi divorced Elene in order to marry Khvaramze, daughter of Bezhan Dadiani of Mingrelia. Mamia succeeded on the death of his father in 1726. In 1732, he forged an alliance with King Alexander V of Imereti, marrying the king's daughter Rodam, and rendered support to Alexander against the coalition of western Georgian nobles led by Otia Dadiani, Prince of Mingrelia, Grigol, Duke of Racha, and Zurab Abashidze, who intended to place Alexander's brother Mamuka on the throne of Imereti. Alexander and Mamia won the bloody encounter at Chikhori.

Deposition and comeback 
Mamia's relations with Alexander's son and successor, Solomon I, was initially hostile. His involvement in an ultimately unsuccessful coup against Solomon in 1752 cost him the throne of Guria: Solomon returned with Ottoman support in 1756 and deposed Mamia in favor of his younger brother, Giorgi V Gurieli. Mamia fled to the mountains of Racha and eventually crossed into eastern Georgia to solicit support from the resurgent king Heraclius II of Kakheti. Through Heraclius's intercession, Mamia garnered favor with the Ottoman pasha of Akhaltsikhe and was restored in Guria in 1758. He reconciled with Solomon and took part in his struggle against the Ottoman encroachments and slave-trading. In 1765, the pasha of Akhaltsikhe overthrew Mamia and replaced him with his more amenable brother, Giorgi V Gurieli.  

During the Russo-Turkish War of 1767–1774, Solomon invaded Guria, defeated an Ottoman force marching from Batumi to Imereti, and restored Mamia in his principality. The relations between the two rulers quickly soured as Solomon sought to assert his supremacy in all of western Georgia. In 1775, he twice raided Guria. Mamia's brother and rival Giorgi exploited the instability and forced Mamia into retirement to a monastery. Mamia died in 1784 (or 1778 according to Cyril Toumanoff).

Family 
Mamia was married twice, first to Rodam, Princess of Imereti, and then to a noblewoman Tavdgiridze. He had three children:

 Princess Darejan (died 1813), married to Prince Mkheidze;
 Prince Giorgi, who died very young;
 Princess Tamar.

References 

1778 deaths
1784 deaths
House of Gurieli
18th-century people from Georgia (country)